Francis Newton may also refer to:
Francis Newton (golfer) (1874–1946), American golfer
Francis Newton (priest) (died 1572), English clergyman and Dean of Winchester Cathedral
Francis Milner Newton (1720–1794), English portrait painter and first secretary of the Royal Academy
Francis James Newton (1857–1948), British colonial administrator
Francis Newton, occasional pen name of British historian Eric Hobsbawm

See also

Frank Newton (disambiguation)
Frances Newton (disambiguation)